DDOT may refer to:

 Ḋ, the letter D with dot above
 Ḍ, the letter D with dot below
 D-Dot (born 1968), American hip-hop producer
 Detroit Department of Transportation, in Detroit, Michigan
 District Department of Transportation, in Washington, DC